Fluorophen, or fluorofen, is a fluorinated analogue of phenazocine, an opioid drug of the benzomorphan group, which was developed as a radioligand for the purpose of labeling opioid receptors during PET scans (with 18F). Unlike most other benzomorphan derivatives, fluorophen acts as a full agonist of the opioid receptors with preferential affinity for the μ-opioid receptor (approximately 6x that of morphine), similar but slightly lower affinity for the δ-opioid receptor (equipotent to [D-Ala2, D-Leu5]enkephalin), and very low affinity for the κ-opioid receptor.

References

Benzomorphans
Opioids
Fluoroarenes
Phenols